Shona Rubens (born 31 October 1986 in Sydney, Australia) is a Canadian alpine skier.

Rubens qualified to compete for Canada at the 2006 Winter Olympics after placing 18th in a World Cup downhill in St. Moritz, Switzerland.  
Her other career highlights including placing second in downhill at the 2004 Lake Louise Nor-Am Cup and placing fifth in the super-G at 2005 Canadian championships.

Personal life
Rubens has lived in Canmore, Alberta for two years and grew up in Calgary, Alberta.
Rubens went to high school at the Calgary-based National Sport School.

References

External links
Shona Rubens on Real Champions

1986 births
Living people
Olympic alpine skiers of Canada
Alpine skiers at the 2006 Winter Olympics
Alpine skiers at the 2010 Winter Olympics
Sportspeople from Alberta
Canadian female alpine skiers
Australian female alpine skiers
Sportswomen from New South Wales
Skiers from Calgary
Skiers from Sydney